The Men's 4 x 7.5 kilometre biathlon relay competition at the 1968 Winter Olympics took place on 15 February, at Autrans. Each national team consisted of four members, with each skiing 7.5 kilometres and shooting twice, once prone and once standing. This was the first time the biathlon relay was contested in the Olympic program.

Results 
Norway had won the first two official relay competitions at the Biathlon World Championships, but in Grenoble they were forced to ski five penalty loops while the Soviet Union skied only two, allowing the Soviets to pull away to win by almost two minutes. Sweden didn't go on the penalty loop at all, the only team to do so, and while their skiing couldn't match the top two, they did manage to finish in the bronze medal spot, just as they had in the two previous world championship relays.

References

Relay